Trần Tuấn Việt is a Vietnamese photographer, known as "the man who brings Vietnam's images to the world". He is a contributing photographer for National Geographic and Google Arts & Culture, an online art and culture platform run by Google.

Life and career 
Tran Tuan Viet was born in Vinh in 1983. From 1998 to 2001, he studied at Vinh University's High School for the Gifted. He moved to Hanoi in 2001 and studied architecture at the Hanoi University of Civil Engineering from 2001 to 2006. In 2007, Tuan Viet started his career as a freelance photographer. In 2015, he joined the photography community of the National Geographic Society, one of the largest photography communities in the world and was recognized as the most successful Vietnamese photographer in this community.

In 2016, Tran Tuan Viet became a photographer for Getty Images. In 2019, he joined project "Wonders of Vietnam" by Google in collaboration with the National Administration of Tourism (Vietnam), published on Google Arts & Culture.

Tran Tuan Viet holds the role of judge of many major art competitions in Vietnam and globally.

Awards 

 2017 The 9th International Artistic photo contest in Vietnam Gold medal
 2017 Vietnam's Excellence Photography of the Year award
 15th Annual Smithsonian Photo Contest Winner
 2019 Environmental Photographer of the Year Special Commended
 2019 Travel Photographer of the Year, Finalist
 2020 World's Best Photo of Fun by Agora, Winner
 2020 World's Best Photo of Architecture by Agora, Winner
 2020 World's Best Photo of Eyes 2020 by Agora, Winner
 2021 Smithsonian's 18th Annual photo contest

Exhibitions 
 2016 – Hanoi's art photo exhibition in Ha Noi, Vietnam
 2017 – VN-17 in Ha Noi, Vietnam
 2018 – Session "Learning about Vietnam" of Ministry of Foreign Affairs (Vietnam) in Ha Noi, Vietnam
 2018 – Youth Photography Ministry of Culture, Sports and Tourism (Vietnam) in Ha Noi, Vietnam
 2019 – VN-19 in Ha Noi, Vietnam
 2020 – Travel Photographers of the Year winners London, Vương quốc Anh
 2020 – World Water Day, Italy
 2021 – "Vietnam" – Xposure International Photography Festival, Sharjah, United Arab Emirates
 2021 – "Wonders of Vietnam", Google Arts & Culture

Televisions

References

External links 
Tran Tuan Viet on Facebook
Tran Tuan Viet on Instagram
Official website

1983 births
Living people
Vietnamese photographers